The Conservatoire botanique Pyrénéen, also known as the Conservatoire botanique national Midi-Pyrénées, is a botanical conservatory specializing in flora of the Pyrenees. It is located in the Vallon de Salut, BP315, Bagnères-de-Bigorre, Hautes-Pyrénées, Midi-Pyrénées, France, and open to the public Friday afternoons in the warmer months.

The conservatory was established in 1999 to preserve the endemic plant species of the Pyrenees. It is primarily a research establishment but also contains the herbarium collections of Louis Ramond de Carbonnières, Pierrine Gaston-Sacaze, Pierre Le Brun, and Georges Bosc, totalling some 30,000 specimens.

See also 
 List of botanical gardens in France

External links 
 Conservatoire botanique Pyrénéen
 Conservatoires Botaniques Nationaux
 Ministère de l'écologie, du développement et de l'aménagement durables (French)
 Tourisme Hautes Pyrenees article (French)
 Biodiversity Collections Index entry

Pyreneen, Conservatoire botanique
Pyreneen, Conservatoire botanique